is a Japanese voice actress. She has had several starring roles in anime shows such as Love Momozono / Cure Peach in Fresh Pretty Cure, Aki Yamamoto in Yes! PreCure 5, Hazuki Makino in Loups=Garous,  Akie Takasugi in Hell Girl: Three Vessels, Minamo Aoi in Real Drive. She also voiced Jacqueline du Pré in Soul Eater.

Filmography

Anime
{| class="wikitable sortable plainrowheaders"
|+ List of voice performances in anime
! Year
! Title
! Role
! class="unsortable"| Notes
! class="unsortable"| Source
|-
|  || Futari wa Pretty Cure Splash Star || Various characters  || || 
|-
|  || Digimon Savers || Reporter || ||  
|-
|  || Air Gear || Schoolgirl || || 
|-
|  || Katekyo Hitman Reborn!''' || Various characters || || 
|-
|  || Hataraki Man || Bookshop employee ||  || 
|-
|  || Saint October || Kazu, Tin || ||  
|-
|  || Yes! PreCure 5 || Aki Yamamoto || || 
|-
|  || Kamen Rider Kiva || Octopus Fangireオクトパスファンガイア || Ep. 2|| 
|-
|  || Yes! PreCure 5 GoGo! || Miyu || || 
|-
|  || Soul Eater  || Jacqueline O. Lantern Dupré  || || 
|-
|  || Real Drive || Minamo Aoi || || 
|-
|  || Library War || Various characters  || || 
|-
|  || Slayers Revolution || Girl || || 
|-
|  || Casshern Sins || Various characters || || 
|-
|  || Hell Girl: Three Vessels ||  Akie Takasugi || || 
|-
|  || Maria-sama ga Miteru || Student || season 4 || 
|-
|  || White Album || Assistant || ||  
|-
|  || Genji Monogatari Sennenki || Dog犬君 || || 
|-
|  || Fresh Pretty Cure! || Love Momozono / Cure Peach || || 
|-
|  || Mainichi Kaasan || Cousin older sisterいとこ姉 || || 
|-
|  || Gokujō!! Mecha Mote Iinchō || Mamoru Uemura上村真衣 || || 
|-
|  || Sweet Blue Flowers || Kaori Ueno || || 
|-
|  || Soreike! Anpanman || Tekkanokomakichan鉄火のコマキちゃん || || 
|-
|  || Anyamaru Tantei Kiruminzuu || Female college student || ||  
|-
|  || Kimi ni Todoke || Shino || || 
|-
|  || Durarara!! || Kasuka Heiwajima (young) || || 
|-
|  || Tensou Sentai Goseiger || AntiYuumajuu Pikarime of the Shakokidogu遮光器土偶のピカリ眼 || Ep. 28 || 
|-
|  || The Legend of the Legendary Heroes || Girl's voice || || 
|-
| –11 || Digimon Fusion || Yu Amano || || 
|-
|  || Sengoku Otome: Momoiro Paradox ||  Motochika Chōsokabe || || 
|-
|  || Beyblade: Shogun Steel || Ren Kurenai || || 
|-
|  || La storia della Arcana Famiglia || Liberta (young) || || 
|-
|  || Love, Chunibyo & Other Delusions || Kimera, student ||   || 
|-
|  || Medaka Box Abnormal || Hirado Royal平戸ロイヤル || || 
|-
|  || Noragami || Passerby || || 
|-
|  || Super Sonico the Animation || Arco, managerアーコ／店長 || || 
|-
|  || Love, Chunibyo & Other Delusions! Love || Kimera, student || || 
|-
|  || The Irregular at Magic High School || Akane Kasuga || || 
|-
|  || Soul Eater Not! || Jacqueline O Lantern Dupre || || 
|-
|  || Gonna be the Twin-Tail!! || Female announcer || || 
|-
|  || Cardfight!! Vanguard G || Child || || 
|-
|  || Prison School || Girl, teacher || || 
|-
|  || Peanuts Snoopy short animePEANUTS スヌーピー -ショートアニメ- || Shroeder || || 
|-
|  || Assassination Classroom || Child || season 2 || 
|-
|  || Pandora in the Crimson Shell: Ghost Urn || Chinaチャイナ || || 
|-
|  || Seisen Cerberus || Amo, Marittaアモ／マリッタ || || 
|-
|  || Kabaneri of the Iron Fortress || Kajika || || 
|-
|  || Time Travel Girl || Elizabeth || || 
|-
|  || All Out!! || Risa Yasaka || || 
|-
|  || ACCA: 13-Territory Inspection Dept. || Passerパッサー || || 
|-
| || Soreike! Anpanman || Komaki with iron fire鉄火のコマキちゃん || || 
|-
|}

Films

Video games

Dubbing

 Zoo - Chloe Tousignant (Nora Arnezeder)
 Caillou (Teletoon / Treehouse TV) (animated TV series (Japanese)) - Caillou (since starts 1999 as debut in Japan)
 Higglytown Heroes'' (Playhouse Disney Junior) (animated TV series (Japanese)) - Twinkle (since starts 2005 as debut in Japan)

Tokusatsu

References

External links
 

1984 births
Japanese voice actresses
Living people